A webbed neck, or pterygium colli, is a congenital skin fold that runs along the sides of the neck down to the shoulders.
There are many variants.

Signs and symptoms
On babies, webbed neck may look like loose folds of skin on the neck. As the child grows, the skin may stretch out to look like there is little or no neck.

Associated conditions
It is a feature of Turner syndrome (only found in girls) and Noonan syndrome, as well as the rarer Klippel–Feil syndrome, or Diamond–Blackfan anemia

References

External links 

Congenital disorders of eye, ear, face and neck